Louis-Joseph Pigeon (7 July 1922 – 2 March 1993) was a Progressive Conservative party member of the House of Commons of Canada. He was an agrologist by career, and worked for the Liberal minister of labour during the St Laurent government.

He was first elected at the Joliette—L'Assomption—Montcalm riding in the 1958 general election and re-elected there for successive terms in
1962 and 1963. After completing his third and final term, the 26th Canadian Parliament, Pigeon left the House of Commons and did not seek further re-election.

In August 1962, he became Parliamentary Secretary to the Minister of Agriculture, a post he held until February 1963.

External links
 

1922 births
1993 deaths
Members of the House of Commons of Canada from Quebec
Progressive Conservative Party of Canada MPs